Sageika (also: Σαγαίικα - Sagaiika) is a village and a community in the municipal unit of Movri, western Achaea, Greece. The population of the village is about 1000. It is located in the plains between the Movri hills and the Gulf of Patras. It is 3 km west of Kareika, 6 km east of Metochi, 9 km southwest of Kato Achaia and 28 km southwest of Patras. The Greek National Road 9 (Patras - Pyrgos) runs through the village. 

Sageika was the seat of the municipality of Movri, named for the Movri hills south of the village. The municipality was created under the Kapodistrias reform in 1998. 

The community Sageika consists of the following villages (population in 2011):
Sageika, pop. 1038
Apostoloi, pop. 88
Bouteika, pop. 149
Vrachneika, pop. 13
Gerouseika, pop. 557
Stathmos, pop. 23

Population

See also
List of settlements in Achaea

References

External links
GTP - Sageika

Populated places in Achaea